All for Nothing may refer to:

Music 
 All for Nothing (band), a Dutch band
 All for Nothing / Nothing for All, a 1997 two-disc compilation album by the Replacements

Songs
 "All for Nothing" (song), by Linkin Park, 2014
 "All for Nothing", by Against from Loyalty and Betrayal, 2007
 "All for Nothing", by Brand New Unit, 1995
 "All for Nothing", by Fighting with Wire from Man vs Monster, 2008
 "All for Nothing", by Late Night Alumni from Empty Streets, 2005
 "All for Nothing", by Matt Cardle from Letters, 2011
 "All for Nothing", by Separation, 1998
 "All for Nothing", from the soundtrack of the video game God of War III, 2010

Other uses
 All for Nothing?, a Canadian real estate and design television series
 "All for Nothing" (Arrow), a 2018 episode of Arrow
 All for Nothing, a 1928 film directed by James Parrott
 "All for Nothing", a 1964 short story by David R. Bunch